Ilhéu Caroço is an uninhabited islet in the Gulf of Guinea, part of São Tomé and Príncipe. The islet is located southeast of the island of Príncipe, about 3 km off the coast. Its area is about 0.4 km. The islet is steep, rocky and wooded, and rises to 305 metres elevation.

References

Caroco
Príncipe